Commersonia corylifolia, commonly known as hazel-leaved rulingia,<ref name=FB>{{FloraBase|name=Commersonia corylifolia|id=40863}}</ref> is a species of flowering plant in the family Malvaceae and endemic to the southwest of Western Australia. It is a spreading, erect shrub with egg-shaped to narrowly egg-shaped leaves, and white to cream-coloured flowers.

The edges of the leaves have irregular teeth, the upper surface wrinkled and the lower surface densely covered with pale, star-shaped hairs. Flowering occurs from November to January and the fruit is a spherical capsule  in diameter and densely-covered with white, star-shaped hairs.

Taxonomy
This species was first described in 1832 by Robert Graham who gave it the name Rulingia corylifolia in the Edinburgh New Philosophical Journal. In 2011, Carolyn Wilkins and Barbara Whitlock transferred the species to the genus Commersonia in Australian Systematic Botany. The specific epithet (corylifolia) means "hazel-leaved".

Distribution and habitat
Hazel-leaved rulingia grows in sheltered forest and on roadsides between Augusta and Albany in the Jarrah Forest and Warren bioregions of southern Western Australia.

Conservation statusCommersonia corylifolia'' is listed as "not threatened" by the Government of Western Australia Department of Biodiversity, Conservation and Attractions.

References

corylifolia
Endemic flora of Western Australia
Rosids of Western Australia
Plants described in 1832
Taxa named by Robert Graham